The Horseshoe Moraine is the name for a series of moraines that cover much of southern Ontario, west of the Niagara Escarpment.  A lobe of the horseshoe moraine abuts the well-known Oak Ridges Moraine in the extreme west of the headwaters of the Humber River.

References

Moraines of Ontario